Patrick Posipal (born 3 March 1988) is a German footballer who plays as a midfielder for Lüneburger SK Hansa.

Career
Posipal joined Meppen from Lüneburger SK Hansa in 2015.

Personal life
Patrick Posipal is the son of former Eintracht Braunschweig player Peer Posipal and the grandson of 1954 FIFA World Cup winner Josef Posipal.

References

External links
 
 

1988 births
Living people
Sportspeople from Braunschweig
German footballers
Footballers from Lower Saxony
Association football midfielders
3. Liga players
Regionalliga players
Hamburger SV II players
TuS Heeslingen players
FC Oberneuland players
TSV Havelse players
Lüneburger SK Hansa players
SV Meppen players
VfB Oldenburg players
German people of Romanian descent